Gonzalo Pieres Jr. (born December 17, 1982) Buenos Aires, Buenos Aires Province is a professional Argentine polo player with a 10-goal handicap. Currently, he is ranked number 3.

Biography

Early life
Gonzalito was born into a family of polo players and is the eldest son of polo legend Gonzalo Pieres Sn and his wife Cecilia Rodríguez Piola. His siblings are Tatiana Pieres, married to 10-goaler Mariano Aguerre, Facundo Pieres, Nicolas Pieres and Cecilia Pieres.

Career
He debuted in the Argentine Open in 1999, taking part every year since then. After losing the Argentine Open finals in 2005 and 2007 in extra-time only, his team Ellerstina was considered a strong rival for the La Dolfina Polo Team and in 2008 met the expectations by beating La Dolfina 13-12 through a golden goal in an extra-chukka, which was made by Gonzalo.

Other teams Gonzalo played for include Audi, Loro Piana, Outback, Ellerston, Tonkawa, and Black Watch. He has won tournaments in Sotogrande (Spain), Deauville (France) and England. In 2008, he won the Abierto Argentino de Polo with Ellerstina Etiqueta Negra and the Queen's Cup with Ellerston for the first time.

Honors
Pieres was inducted into the Museum of Polo and Hall of Fame in 2008.

References

External links
Profile on World Polo Tour
Tournaments
Interview with G. Pieres
Ellerstina Polo Team

Argentine polo players
Sportspeople from Buenos Aires Province
1982 births
Living people